Calvin Leon Graham (April 3, 1930 – November 6, 1992) was the youngest U.S. serviceman to serve and fight during World War II. Following the attack on Pearl Harbor, he enlisted in the United States Navy from Houston, Texas on August 15, 1942, at the age of 12.  His case was similar to that of Jack W. Hill, who was granted significant media attention due to holding service number one million during World War II, but later was discovered to have lied about his age and subsequently discharged.

Early life 
Graham was born in Canton, Texas, and was attending elementary school in Houston before he decided to join the Navy, after his father had died and his mother had remarried.

US Navy, World War II 
He enlisted in the Navy on August 15, 1942, and was sent to boot camp in San Diego, California, for six weeks, and afterwards he was sent to Pearl Harbor at Oahu, Hawaii, where he was assigned to USS South Dakota.

USS South Dakota 
The South Dakota left Pearl Harbor on October 16. On October 26, 1942, he participated in the Battle of the Santa Cruz. The South Dakota and her crew received a Navy Unit Commendation for the action. On the night of November 14–15, 1942, Graham was wounded during the Naval Battle of Guadalcanal. He served as a loader for a 40 mm anti-aircraft gun and was hit by shrapnel while taking a hand message to an officer. Though he received fragmentation wounds, he helped in rescue duty by aiding and pulling the wounded aboard ship to safety. He was awarded the Bronze Star Medal and the Purple Heart, and he and his crewmates were awarded another Navy Unit Commendation.

The South Dakota returned to the East Coast on December 18, 1942, for an overhaul and battle damage repairs (she had taken 42 hits from at least three enemy ships) in New York City, and since then, was named "Battleship X" in order to make the Japanese think she had been sunk. Graham's mother revealed his age after he traveled to his grandmother's funeral in Texas (he arrived a day late) without permission from the Navy, for which he spent three months in a Texas brig. He was released after his sister threatened to contact the newspapers. Although he had tried to return to his ship, he was discharged from the Navy on April 1, 1943, and his awards were revoked. The South Dakotas gunnery officer who was involved in handling his case was Sargent Shriver.

He then worked in a Houston shipyard as a welder after dropping out of school.  At age 14 he married and became a father the following year.  At age 17 he was divorced when he enlisted in the Marine Corps.

US Marine Corps, 1948–51 
Graham finally joined the United States Marine Corps in 1948 at age 17, but his enlistment in the Marines also ended early when he fell from a pier and broke his back in 1951 during the Korean war. Although serving in the Marine Corps qualified him as a veteran, he would spend the rest of his life fighting for full medical benefits and clearing his military service record.

Post military service
In 1978, he was finally given an honorable discharge for his service in the Navy, and after writing to Congress and with the approval of President Jimmy Carter, all medals except his Purple Heart were reinstated. His story came to public attention in 1988, when his story was told in the TV movie, Too Young the Hero starring Rick Schroder.

In 1988, he received disability benefits and back pay for his service in the Navy after President Ronald Reagan signed legislation that granted Graham full disability benefits, increased his back pay to $4,917 and allowed him $18,000 for past medical bills, contingent on receipts for the medical services. By this time, some of the doctors who treated him had died and many medical bills were lost. He received only $2,100 of the possible $18,000. While the money for the rights to his story for the movie, Too Young The Hero amounted to $50,000, 50% went to two agents and 20% went to a writer of an unpublished book about Graham. He and his wife received just $15,000 before taxes.

Death 
Graham's Purple Heart was finally reinstated, and presented to his widow, Mary, on June 21, 1994, by Secretary of the Navy John Dalton in Arlington, Texas, nearly two years after his death from heart failure. He was buried at Laurel Land Memorial Park in Fort Worth, Texas.

Military awards
Graham's decorations and military awards, as finally settled circa 1994 after intervention by Presidents Jimmy Carter, Ronald Reagan, and Bill Clinton:

References

External links
 Lonesailer.org biography
 Comptroller General of the United States: Matter of Calvin L. Graham
 Too Young the Hero on the Internet Movie Database
 
 People Magazine: The Navy's 'Baby' Hero...
 Paul Harvey on Calvin Graham

1930 births
1992 deaths
United States Navy personnel of World War II
United States Marine Corps personnel of the Korean War
Child soldiers in World War II
People from Canton, Texas
United States Marine Corps non-commissioned officers
United States Navy sailors

Calvin Graham at findagrave
https://www.findagrave.com/memorial/10667014/calvin-leon-graham